Nate Mason (born July 25, 1995) is an American professional basketball player for the Guangzhou Loong Lions in the Chinese Basketball Association (CBA). He played college basketball for the Minnesota Golden Gophers. Mason attended High School at Arlington Country Day School in Jacksonville, Florida.

High school career

College career

2014–2015 season

Mason appeared in every game as a freshman, ranking second on the team in steals and assists as a true freshman. He averaged 9.8 points per game, which ranked 4th on the team. He registered 17 games where he scored at least 10 points, including his collegiate debut, where he scored 10 points, 5 rebounds, 1 block, 1 steal and one assist.

2015–2016 season 
Mason appeared in 27 games as a sophomore, and every game until he was suspended for the last 4 games of the season. He led the team in scoring at 13.8 points per game and also led the team in assists at 4.5 per game. He had 21 games where he scored in double figures and had 1 game where he had double digit assists. Against Temple he had 20 points which was a career high up until that point. He broke that career high later in the season against Michigan, with 25 points.

2016–2017 season 
Mason appeared in every game as a junior, and for the second year in a row he led the team in scoring and assists with 15.2 points per game, and 5.0 assists per game. He also led the team in steals, with 1.4 a game. He registered 30 games with more than 10 points, which was all but 4 games in the season. He also had 2 games with double-digit assists, and recorded 1 game with more than 10 rebounds. On January 1, 2017, he set a new career high in points at Purdue, with 31 points. On March 6, 2017, it was announced that Mason had made the First Team All Big Ten.

2017–2018 season
Mason appeared in 31 games, all but one as a senior, and finished 2nd on the team in scoring at 16.7 points per game, while leading the team in assists at 4.2 per game and 3 pointers made with 77. On February 6, 2018, he set a career high with 34 points, and scored in double digits in all but 4 games. As a team, Minnesota struggled with key injuries and suspensions, but Mason was a bright spot in that. He was named an All Big-Ten Honorable Mention by the coaches and media. He finished 5th all time in scoring and 2nd all time in assists at Minnesota. After the season, he represented the Big Ten in the first 3X3U championships, in which 4 seniors who have used all their college eligibility are selected from each conference to play 3 on 3 basketball. He helped lead the Big Ten team to the championship, where they won $50,000 in addition to the $5,000 they had already won to split between the players.

Professional career

Texas Legends
On February 4, 2019, Mason signed with the Texas Legends of the NBA G League. Mason scored 22 points in a loss to the Windy City Bulls on December 20. He missed some time in January 2020 with a shoulder injury.

Hapoel Eilat 
On January 31, 2020, Mason signed with Hapoel Eilat of the Israeli Premier League for the rest of the season. Mason averaged 11.0 points per game, 3.3 assist per game and 0.7 rebounds per game.

BC Avtodor 
He signed a two-year deal with BC Avtodor of the VTB United League on June 26, 2020.

Guangzhou Long Lions 
On October 30, 2021, Mason signed with the Guangzhou Loong Lions of the Chinese Basketball Association.

College statistics

|-
| style="text-align:left;"| 2014–15
| style="text-align:left;"| Minnesota
| 33 || 8 || 26.12 || .409 || .389 || .614 || 2.8 || 2.8 || 1.4 || 0.1 ||9.8
|-
| style="text-align:left;"| 2015–16
| style="text-align:left;"| Minnesota
| 27 || 27 || 32.50 || .389 || .302 || .796 || 2.8 || 4.5 || 0.9 || 0.0 || 13.8
|-
| style="text-align:left;"| 2016–17
| style="text-align:left;"| Minnesota
| 34 || 34 || 34.52 || .376 || .360 ||.808 || 3.6 || 5.0 || 1.4 || 0.1 || 15.2
|-
| style="text-align:left;"| 2017–18
| style="text-align:left;"| Minnesota
| 31 || 31 || 31.10 || .393 || .391 ||.776 || 3.6 || 4.2 || 1.1 || 0.1 || 16.7
|-
| style="text-align:left;"| Career
| style="text-align:left;"| 
| 125 || 100 || 31.8 || .390 || .363 || .762 || 3.3 || 4.1 || 1.3 || 0.1 || 13.8

References

External links
Minnesota Golden Gophers bio 
ESPN profile

1995 births
Living people
American expatriate basketball people in Israel
American expatriate basketball people in Russia
American men's basketball players
Basketball players from Georgia (U.S. state)
BC Avtodor Saratov players
Hapoel Eilat basketball players
Minnesota Golden Gophers men's basketball players
People from Decatur, Georgia
Point guards
Shooting guards
Sportspeople from DeKalb County, Georgia
Texas Legends players